The Way I Feel Today is an album of cover songs by the American singer-songwriter Stan Ridgway, released in 1998 by Dis-Information Recordings.

Track listing

Personnel
Adapted from The Way I Feel Today liner notes.
Musicians
Stan Ridgway – lead vocals, production
Don Bell – saxophone, brass
Hecate's Angels –  backing vocals
Rick King – guitar
Bill Noland – keyboards, production
Mark Plemsone – string arrangements
David Sutton – bass guitar
Pietra Wexstun –  backing vocals, production

Production and additional personnel
Michael Dittrick – recording, editing
Matt Maxwell – cover art, art direction
Robert McNeely – production

Release history

References

External links 
 

1998 albums
Covers albums
Stan Ridgway albums
Albums produced by Stan Ridgway